Disa ferruginea is a stout, reed-like terrestrial 200–450 mm tall. Radical leaves linear, developing after flowering; cauline leaves dry, sheathing. Inflorescence dense, 1–40 flowered. Flowers bright red to orange, often with some parts yellow. Median sepal apiculate, galea 8–10 mm deep; spur slender, grading into the galea, 7–20 mm long; lateral sepals projecting away;elliptic to narrowly elliptic, with apiculi up to 4 mm long;petals spear-shaped, 5–7 mm long; lip narrowly egg- to spear-shaped, 10–12 mm long.

Distribution
The species is endemic to the South-Western Cape of South Africa. In fynbos vegetation.

Habitat
Occasional to common in dry to slightly damp localities, usually in the zone of the southeaster clouds, from 400 to 1,500 m. Pollinated by the mountain pride butterfly. Hybridizes very rarely with D.graminifolia. Flowers between February and March, stimulated by fire.

References

External links

 
 

ferruginea
Endemic orchids of South Africa